The Harlan Community School District is a rural public school district based in Harlan, Iowa.  The district is mainly in Shelby County, with a small area in Harrison County.  The district serves the towns of Harlan, Defiance, Earling, Panama, Portsmouth and Westphalia, the unincorporated communities of Jacksonville and Corley, and the surrounding rural areas.

The school's mascot is the Cyclones. Their colors are red and black.

Schools
The district operates four schools, all in Harlan:
Harlan Primary School
Harlan Intermediate School
Harlan Community Middle School
Harlan Community High School

Harlan Community High School

Athletics
The Cyclones compete in the Hawkeye 10 Conference in the following sports:

Fall Sports
Football
 13-time Class 3A State Champions (1972, 1982, 1983, 1984, 1993, 1995, 1997, 1998, 2003, 2004, 2005, 2009, 2021)
Cross Country (boys and girls)
Girls' - 2005 Class 3A State Champions
Volleyball
 2-time Class 4A State Champions (2013, 2014)

Winter Sports
Basketball (boys and girls)
 Boys' - 2-time Class 3A State Champions (2004, 2006)
 Girls' - 2-time Class 4A State Champions (2014, 2015)
Bowling
Wrestling
1967 Class A State Champions

Spring Sports
Golf (boys and girls)
 Girls' - 2-time Class 2A State Champions (1993, 1995)
 Soccer (boys and girls)
Tennis (boys and girls)
Track and Field (boys and girls)
 Boys' 2-time State Champions (1954, 2003)

Summer Sports
Baseball
 3-time Class 3A State Champions (1996, 2003, 2016)
Softball

See also
List of school districts in Iowa
List of high schools in Iowa

References

External links
 Harlan Community School District

Education in Shelby County, Iowa
Education in Harrison County, Iowa
School districts in Iowa